Timi Brown-Powers (born 1967) is an American therapist and politician serving as a member of the Iowa House of Representatives, representing District 61. She was first elected to the House in 2014.

Early life and education
Timi Brown-Powers was born at Beale Air Force Base in Yuba County, California and raised in the Beaverdale neighborhood of Des Moines, Iowa. Her father worked at the Firestone plant while her mother ran a business out of their home and worked for the Des Moines public schools. Her experiences with her grandmother, a paraplegic, led her to volunteer for programs that help students with disabilities. She graduated from Herbert Hoover High School and attended Des Moines Area Community College for a year. She then moved to Waterloo to attend the University of Northern Iowa, where she earned a Bachelor of Arts in therapeutic recreation.

Career 
As a student at the University of Northern Iowa, Brown-Powers worked as a certified nursing assistant. She then worked as a therapist for Covenant Medical Center in Waterloo for over 25 years.

Brown-Powers announced her candidacy for Anesa Kajtazovic's seat in the Iowa House of Representatives on March 8, 2014 at the Black Hawk County Democratic Convention. She was endorsed by Americans for Democratic Action. She defeated Brad Condon and Andrew Miller in the Democratic primary.

Brown-Powers earned 59% of the vote in the general election, defeating Republican Nathan Bolton's 40%.

References

External links
 Profile from the Iowa House of Representatives
 Timi for Iowa campaign website
 Biography from Project Vote Smart

1967 births
Date of birth missing (living people)
Living people
Democratic Party members of the Iowa House of Representatives
People from Yuba County, California
American occupational health practitioners
Politicians from Waterloo, Iowa
University of Northern Iowa alumni
Women state legislators in Iowa
21st-century American politicians
21st-century American women politicians